Výrava is the name of multiple settlements:
 Výrava (Medzilaborce District), village in Slovakia
 Výrava (Hradec Králové District), village in Czech Republic